Eparchy of Lviv is an eparchy (diocese) of the Orthodox Church of Ukraine. The eparchy covers territory of Lviv Oblast.

The seat of Eparchy is in the Dormition Church in Lviv.

History
The Eparchy of Lviv was founded in 1989 after the restoration of the Ukrainian Autocephalous Orthodox Church. Until 2018, it was the administration office of the afformentioned church.

The Dormition Church performs the functions of the cathedral. The current bishop is the Metropolitan of Lviv Macarius of Lviv.

References

External links

Orthodox Church of Ukraine
Eastern Orthodox dioceses in Ukraine